Iron silicide may refer to the following chemical compounds:

Diiron silicide, Fe2Si
Iron monosilicide, FeSi
Iron disilicide, FeSi2